The 2012–13 Slovak 1.Liga season was the 20th season of the Slovak 1. Liga, the second level of ice hockey in Slovakia. 12 teams participated in the league, and HC 46 Bardejov won the championship.

Regular season

Playoffs

Playouts

Relegation 
 HK Trebišov - MŠK Hviezda D. Kubín 4:2 (3:1, 2:3, 4:6, 3:2 SO, 4:2, 5:2)

External links
 Slovak Ice Hockey Federation

4
Slovak 1. Liga seasons
Slov